From Enslavement to Obliteration is the second studio album by English grindcore band Napalm Death, released in 1988. It is the final studio album with vocalist Lee Dorrian and guitarist Bill Steer, and the first to feature bassist Shane Embury, the band's longest-tenured member. A remastered version was released on 2 April 2012. Loudwire put it on the list of the 10 best metal albums of 1988.

Background

The album's lyrical themes cover a variety of social and political topics, including misogyny/sexism ("It's a M.A.N.S World" and "Inconceivable?"), animal rights ("Display to Me…"), racism ("Unchallenged Hate" and "From Enslavement to Obliteration"), materialism ("Private Death"), and anti-capitalism ("Make Way!"). The album calls for social change, as seen in the song "Uncertainty Blurs the Vision," quoting Rudimentary Peni at the song's conclusion.

Shane Embury retrospectively commented on the band's progression up until From Enslavement to Obliteration in Kerrang! magazine:

Reception

In 2009 From Enslavement to Obliteration was ranked number 1 in Terrorizers list of essential European grindcore albums. Writer Jonathan Horsley described it as marking "the genre's perilous rite of passage through Britain's post-industrial urban landscape." Classic Rock reviewer remarked how the stable line-up brought "new maturity and coherence" and reminded that "for an all-too-brief moment in time, this album could lay claim to being the most extreme collection of songs ever recorded".

In 2017, Rolling Stone ranked From Enslavement to Obliteration as 59th on their list of 'The 100 Greatest Metal Albums of All Time.'

Track listing

 The Curse The Curse''' is a free 7-inch extended play included in the initial copies of the From Enslavement to Obliteration LP, which was released through Earache Records in September 1988.

The cover uses the famous photograph of Phan Thi Kim Phuc fleeing a napalm attack, taken by Nick Ut.

 Track listing 

The song "Morbid Deceiver" is a re-recording of the song "Deceiver", originally on the album Scum.

Personnel
Napalm Death
Lee Dorrian – lead vocals
Bill Steer – guitars
Shane Embury – bass 
Mick Harris – drums, backing vocals

Production
Steve Bird – engineering
Mark Sikora – cover art
Mike Marsh – mastering

Trivia

Some LPs had a sticker with the following line printed on it: "We wanted to be the biggest rock band in the world and you don't do that sounding like Napalm Death" Joe Elliot (Def Leppard)

Grindcore band Sore Throat included a track called "From Off License to Obliteration" on their 101-track 1988 album Disgrace to the Corpse of Sid'', also released on Earache Records.

Charts

References

Napalm Death albums
1988 albums
Earache Records albums